Sridhar Condoor, Ph.D., is the Chair of the Aerospace and Mechanical Engineering department at Saint Louis University's School of Science and Engineering. He is a KEEN fellow, a Coleman Fellow, the editor of the Journal of Engineering Entrepreneurship.

Condoor is spearheading Technology Entrepreneurship education at Saint Louis University via Weekly Innovation Challenges, iScholars program, Idea to Product (I2P), and funded research. He is the Principal Investigator for the Kern Entrepreneurship Education Network (KEEN) Program Development Grants to foster the spirit of innovation in engineering students.

Research
Condoor is the inventor VayuWind, a hubless wind turbine for urban environments. VayuWind is a Vertical Axis Wind Turbine (VAWT) which deploys airfoils parallel to the rotational axis. It improves on the traditional VAWT by using a ring frame leaving the central portion open for other uses. This feature enables VayuWind to extract wind power using existing structures such as utility poles, commercial buildings and skywalks with minimal noise pollution. VayuWind adds space saving and aesthetics to the benefits of the traditional VAWT (changing wind directions and bird-friendly nature) making it an ideal turbine for urban environment.

Honors and awards
 Kern Entrepreneurship Education Network Excellence Award (2013). The award recognizes "Innovation Challenges" iBook as an outstanding innovative educational practice that can be transferable to other educational institutions. 
 Kern Entrepreneurship Education Network Best in Class Award (2012). The award is given to the outstanding school in the network. 
 Saint Louis University Faculty Excellence Award (2012) 
 Kern Entrepreneurship Education Network Wolf Pack Award (2011). The award is given to the outstanding Faculty and Network Contributor. It is judged on contributions made to strengthen the KEEN Wolf Pack. 
 Saint Louis University Excellence in Research Award (2010)
 Saint Louis University Magis Service Award (2009)

Professional memberships and associations
 American Society of Mechanical Engineers (ASME)
 American Society for Engineering Education (ASEE)

Notable publications
 Condoor, S. S., & Keogh, G. (2012) "Weekly Innovation Challenge: Mind Workouts for Teams".

References

External links
 Condoor's faculty profile at Parks College of Engineering, Aviation and Technology
 Weekly Innovation Challenge
 Kern Entrepreneurship Education Network
 Journal of Engineering Entrepreneurship
 The Coleman Foundation
 Cook School of Business
 iScholars Program

Saint Louis University faculty
21st-century American inventors
People from Nellore
Living people
Year of birth missing (living people)
Texas A&M University alumni